Piqua may refer to:

 Pekowi, a band of the Shawnee Native American tribe and the origin of the word "Piqua"
 Piqua, Kansas
 Piqua, Kentucky
 Piqua, Ohio